Ted Bengt Georg Åström (born 28 May 1945) is a Swedish actor. As a student Åström attended the Adolf Fredrik's Music School in Stockholm. He has appeared in more than 20 films and television shows since 1970.

Filmography

References

External links

1945 births
Living people
20th-century Swedish male actors
21st-century Swedish male actors
Swedish male film actors
Swedish male television actors
Male actors from Stockholm